Numerous vessels have been named Vautour (French for "vulture"):

Privateers
 Vautour was a privateer that  captured after a six-hour chase. Vautour was armed with seven 4-pounder guns and two 12-pounder carronades. She was of 130 tons burthen (bm), with a crew of 78 men. She had sailed from Morlaiz on 13 October 1796 and not taken anything.
  was a privateer launched in 1797 at Nantes that the British Royal Navy captured in 1800. She later became the whaler Vulture that a Spanish privateer captured in 1809.
 Vautour, was a privateer from Bordeaux commissioned in July 1797, with 64 men and 10 guns under a Captain Bolle.  captured Vautour on 29 March 1798.
 Vautour, was a privateer cutter from an unknown harbour, commissioned in early 1797, that HMS Impetueux captured on 8 March 1797.
 Vautour was a Spanish felucca privateer of one 9-pounder gun and 54 men that  captured off Altavella (the eastern point of the island of Santo Domingo) on 10 August 1804.

Two privateers named Vautour appear in a list of 78 Corsairs commissioned in Boulogne during the period 1793-1814, with Captains Durand and Captain Orielle.

Naval vessels
  an 18-gun brig-sloop, captured 1809, commissioned in the Royal Navy 1810, and sunk 1813
 Vautour was an  launched in 1795 at Dieppe and belonging to the French Navy.  captured her off Cape Finisterre.
  was launched in the 1920s, scuttled in 1942, refloated, and then sunk in an air raid in 1944.

Citations

References
 
 

Ship names